Honikiwi is a locality in the Ōtorohanga District and Waikato region of New Zealand. It is northwest of Ōtorohanga.

Demographics
The SA1 area is part of the larger Honikiwi statistical area.

The SA1 area had a population of 204 at the 2018 New Zealand census, an increase of 33 people (19.3%) since the 2013 census, and an increase of 39 people (23.6%) since the 2006 census. There were 72 households, comprising 105 males and 96 females, giving a sex ratio of 1.09 males per female. The median age was 38.1 years (compared with 37.4 years nationally), with 36 people (17.6%) aged under 15 years, 48 (23.5%) aged 15 to 29, 90 (44.1%) aged 30 to 64, and 27 (13.2%) aged 65 or older.

Ethnicities were 94.1% European/Pākehā, 13.2% Māori, 1.5% Pacific peoples, 1.5% Asian, and 2.9% other ethnicities. People may identify with more than one ethnicity.

Although some people chose not to answer the census's question about religious affiliation, 50.0% had no religion, 35.3% were Christian, 1.5% had Māori religious beliefs, 1.5% were Buddhist and 1.5% had other religions.

Of those at least 15 years old, 24 (14.3%) people had a bachelor's or higher degree, and 36 (21.4%) people had no formal qualifications. The median income was $36,900, compared with $31,800 nationally. 30 people (17.9%) earned over $70,000 compared to 17.2% nationally. The employment status of those at least 15 was that 90 (53.6%) people were employed full-time, 30 (17.9%) were part-time, and 3 (1.8%) were unemployed.

Honikiwi statistical area

Honikiwi statistical area had a population of 1,581 at the 2018 New Zealand census, an increase of 225 people (16.6%) since the 2013 census, and an increase of 405 people (34.4%) since the 2006 census. There were 549 households, comprising 816 males and 762 females, giving a sex ratio of 1.07 males per female. The median age was 37.0 years (compared with 37.4 years nationally), with 369 people (23.3%) aged under 15 years, 261 (16.5%) aged 15 to 29, 744 (47.1%) aged 30 to 64, and 204 (12.9%) aged 65 or older.

Ethnicities were 86.9% European/Pākehā, 19.5% Māori, 1.7% Pacific peoples, 2.8% Asian, and 1.7% other ethnicities. People may identify with more than one ethnicity.

The percentage of people born overseas was 14.6, compared with 27.1% nationally.

Although some people chose not to answer the census's question about religious affiliation, 57.3% had no religion, 29.8% were Christian, 0.8% had Māori religious beliefs, 0.9% were Hindu, 0.2% were Buddhist and 1.7% had other religions.

Of those at least 15 years old, 183 (15.1%) people had a bachelor's or higher degree, and 267 (22.0%) people had no formal qualifications. The median income was $35,900, compared with $31,800 nationally. 222 people (18.3%) earned over $70,000 compared to 17.2% nationally. The employment status of those at least 15 was that 672 (55.4%) people were employed full-time, 219 (18.1%) were part-time, and 51 (4.2%) were unemployed.

Education
Honikiwi requested a school in 1906, but the application was rejected. The community offered to build a school if the Board of Education would fund a teacher, but although a site was allocated and material for the school procured, permission to build was denied. The school was allowed to proceed in December 1907, and was built by the end of the year.

The school building was replaced in 1930, with the opening notable for a fight breaking out.

The school was still open in 1973 but had closed by 2018.

References

Ōtorohanga District
Populated places in Waikato